Lumut Naval Base is a Royal Malaysian Navy military base in Lumut, Perak, about  from Kuala Lumpur. It is Malaysia's largest naval base, and it has served as the Royal Malaysian Navy's headquarters since 9 September 1984, replacing Woodland Naval Base in Singapore. This base now serves as the headquarters for the Royal Malaysian Navy's (RMN) Western Fleet Command, while the Sepangar Bay Naval Base serves as the headquarters for the RMN's Eastern Fleet Command.

History

Background 
Woodland Naval Base in Singapore has served as the Malaysian navy's headquarters since before Malaysia gained independence from the United Kingdom. Even after Singapore's expulsion from Malaysia in 1963, the base that serves as the home of KD Malaya is still operational under Malaysia. The Malaysian government planned to move the Royal Malaysia Navy's headquarters to Malaysia in 1969, but they couldn't agree on a location.

1973–1980

Created as a regional naval base 
In order to defend the Malacca Straits, the Royal Malaysia Navy established a small base in Lumut in January 1973.

Upgraded to Navy Headquarters 
On 5 July 1975, Malaysia's then-Prime Minister, Abdul Razak Hussein, visited the Woodland Naval Base and expressed concern that the existing jetty was insufficient for the Royal Malaysia Navy's future plans, and that it was also unsuitable for a Royal Malaysia Navy headquarters located outside of Malaysia. Following his visit, the Royal Malaysian Navy agenda was incorporated into the Third Malaysia Plan, which includes upgrading Woodland Naval Base, fleet modernization, and the construction of two new Royal Malaysian Navy military bases (later to become Lumut Naval Base and Kuantan Naval Base).

Initially, Klang was chosen as the location for the base. However, after a thorough examination of the geography of Klang, they decided on Lumut as the location for the Royal Malaysian Navy headquarters.

Shipyard 

The Royal Malaysian Navy planned to build a shipyard for ship maintenance at Lumut Naval Base in 1977, and two German firms, Blohm & Voss and Thyssen AG, were selected to build the shipyard. The shipyard is now known as the Boustead Naval Shipyard.

Training centre 
In 1977, the Royal Malaysian Navy sent officers to three nations' navy forces, the United Kingdom, France, and West Germany, to visit naval training centres. During their visits, the Royal Malaysian Navy expressed interest in the maritime tactics training and plans to build one in Lumut. Aside from the tactics centre, the Royal Malaysian Navy is also constructing a basic boot camp here.

The training centre received its first batch of recruits for basic training on 14 January 1980.

1980–1990s

The RMN headquarters are relocating to Lumut 

On 9 September 1984, the Royal Malaysian Navy HQ in Woodland Naval Base began relocating to Lumut Naval Base after 9 years of construction. The relocations were marked by a ceremony in accordance with Royal Navy customs. Captain Khoo Tee Chuan, then Commander of Navy Fleet Material Support, led the ceremony by boarding the KD Hang Tuah, which was decked out in all Royal Malaysian Navy unit colours.

Heliport 
The Royal Malaysian Navy purchased six used Westland Wasp helicopters from the Royal Navy in May 1986. As part of the agreement, the Royal Navy will loan two pilots, one aviation engineer, and five aviation technicians to the Royal Malaysian Navy. As a result, the Royal Malaysian Navy constructed a heliport at the Lumut Naval Base, thereby establishing the Naval Air Unit.

Tenants unit 

Lumut Naval Base is a large military installation that houses several Royal Malaysian Navy units. Among the tenants' units are:

Naval units based on land (the Stone frigate).

 Western Fleet Command – The overall command of all RMN operations in Western Malaysia.
 KD Malaya – The unit is in charge of managing the base's services and infrastructure for the staff at the Lumut Naval Base.
 RMN Naval Air HQ – The overall command of all RMN Naval Air units.
 KD Rajawali – The official name of the RMN Naval Air unit stationed at the Lumut Naval Base.
 KD Pelandok – The RMN training centre's official name.
 KD Sultan Idris 1 – The official name of the RMN officers training centre.
 KD Duyong – The RMN diving school's official name.
 Diving and Mine Warfare HQ – The command of the RMN clearance diver, explosive ordnance disposal (EOD), and salvage diver.
 KD Sri Manjung – The official name for the RMN Reserves in Lumut.
 Naval Special Forces HQ – Command of the RMN's special operations forces and training facility.
 KD Panglima Hitam – The official name of PASKAL's Unit 1.
 Protela Lumut – The military police unit who enforce the law on the Lumut Naval Base.

Malaysian Army unit

 96 Armed Forces Hospital – A military hospital under administration of Royal Medical and Dental Corps.
 Spiritual Growth Centre – A spiritual centre under administration of Military Religious Corps.

Facilities 
The following facilities were available at Lumut Naval Base:

 Clubs and messes
 Shopping arcades
 Religious buildings, including:
 An-Nur mosque
 Tai Seong Loh Koon Buddhist temple
 Sri Ramar Hindu temple
 Sports facilities, including:
 Stadiums
 Indoor Stadium
 Golf course
 Swimming pool
 Military hospital
 Schools and kindergartens, including:
 SMK Pangkalan TLDM (Secondary school)
 SK Pangkalan TLDM (Primary school)
 One federal government department responsible for the construction and maintenance of the camp

References 

Manjung District
Royal Malaysian Navy
Military installations of Malaysia